Alberto Pindter Briseño (born December 14, 1991) is a professional Mexican footballer who currently plays for Venados on loan from U. de G.

Pindter began playing football with the Club Atlas reserve team, and nearly joined the senior side in Liga MX.

References

External links

Living people
1991 births
Mexican footballers
Liga MX players
Atlas F.C. footballers
Leones Negros UdeG footballers
Association football midfielders